Generation Ex may refer to:

 "Generation Ex" (song), a 2007 song by Kent
 Generation Ex (album), a 2015 album by Generations from Exile Tribe